Lucy Terry Prince, often credited as simply Lucy Terry (1733–1821), was an American settler and poet. Kidnapped in Africa and enslaved, she was taken to Rhode Island, America. Her future husband purchased her freedom before their marriage in 1756. She composed a ballad poem, "Bars Fight", about a 1746 incident. It was preserved orally until being published in 1855. It is considered the oldest known work of literature by an African American.

Early life
Terry was born in 1733 in Africa. She was abducted from there and sold into slavery in Rhode Island as an infant in about 1733. She spent time in Rhode Island until the age of five, when she was sold to Ebenezer Wells of Deerfield, Massachusetts, who allowed the five-year-old Terry to be baptized into the Christian faith during the Great Awakening.

A successful free black man named Abijah Prince from Curaçao purchased her freedom and married her in 1756.  They were married by justice of the peace Elijah Williams. In 1764, the Princes settled in Guilford, Vermont, where all six of their children were born. Their names were Tatnai, Cesar, Drucilla, Durexa, Abijah Jr. and Festus.  Cesar fought in the Revolutionary War.

Poetry
Terry's work "Bars Fight", composed in 1746, is a ballad about an attack upon two white families by Native Americans on August 25, 1746. This poem is part of the American captivity narrative genre. The attack occurred in an area of Deerfield called "The Bars", which was a colonial term for a meadow.  The poem was preserved orally until it was finally published in 1855 in Josiah Gilbert Holland's History of Western Massachusetts.  This poem is the only surviving work by Terry, although she was famous in her own time for her "rhymes and stories".

Terry's work is considered the oldest known work of literature by an African American, though Phillis Wheatley's, Poems on Various Subjects, Religious and Moral, printed in 1773, was the first published work by an African American.

Farm sabotage and oral arguments
Lucy Terry Prince and Abijah Prince became prominent and prosperous smallholders in Guilford, Vermont but were eventually ruined by a dispute started by their neighbor, a Connecticut man named John Noyes from a slaveholding family, who referred to Lucy's husband as "Abijah Negro." Noyes and various men he had hired damaged the Princes' farm and filed frivolous lawsuits against them. The Princes won every lawsuit but did not succeed in ending the feud. After a particularly ruinous incident, the Princes retained the services of Samuel Knight, a prominent jurist of the era. In 1785, Lucy successfully pled her case before the Governor of Vermont, who found that she had been "much injured" by the Noyes who were "greatly oppressing" her and her husband.  Soon afterwards a mob assembled by Noyes invaded the Princes' farm in the middle of the night, beat a black farmhand nearly to death, burned crops, and left the household in ruins. The state of Vermont prosecuted the mob and sentenced them to prison. Noyes himself bailed out his henchmen, was not himself prosecuted, and served as a state legislator in Vermont for over a decade.

In 1803, Lucy, now destitute, returned to the Vermont Supreme Court to argue on behalf of her sons, against false land claims made against them by Colonel Eli Brownson. She was awarded a sum of $200. She was the first woman to argue before the high court. She stood her own against two of the leading lawyers in the state, one of whom later became the Chief Justice.

In 1806, after months of petitioning, Lucy convinced the town selectmen of Sunderland, Vermont to purchase an additional $200 of land from Brownson for her use, in order to provide for her family.

Lucy reportedly delivered a three-hour address to the board of trustees of Williams College while trying to gain admittance for her son Festus. She was unsuccessful, and Festus was reportedly denied entry on account of the school's racist admission policies. This oral history was recorded at the time of Lucy's death by a local resident, who also reported that Lucy remained popular in her hometown until her old age, and that young boys would often come to her home to hear her talk.

Death 
Prince's husband died in 1794.  By 1803, Prince had moved to nearby Sunderland.  She rode on horseback annually to visit her husband's grave until she died in 1821.

The following obituary was published for Prince on Tuesday, August 21, 1821, in the Greenfield, Massachusetts, paper The Frankylin Herald:
At Sunderland, Vt., July 11th, Mrs. Lucy Prince, a woman of colour. From the church and town records where she formerly resided, we learn that she was brought from Bristol, Rhode Island, to Deerfield, Mass. when she was four years old, by Mr. Ebenezer Wells: that she was 97 years of age—that she was early devoted to God in Baptism: that she united with the church in Deerfield in 1744—Was married to Abijah Prince, May 17th, 1756, by Elijah Williams, Esq. and that she had been the mother of six children. In this remarkable woman there was an assemblage of qualities rarely to be found among her sex. Her volubility was exceeded by none, and in general the fluency of her speech was not destitute of instruction and education. She was much respected among her acquaintance, who treated her with a degree of deference.

The Prince family was remembered in the Guilford community for many decades after their death. John Noyes' daughter was once startled off a horse by the sight of their ghosts, and ghost sightings on their farm have been reported even into the 21st century.

Historical record
Only a single letter in Abijah's hand and none in Lucy's has survived. Because shopkeeper's records show that the household sometimes purchased paper, it is suspected that Lucy wrote other literary works which were eventually lost in the course of the attacks on her household and declining fortune.

References

Further reading
 Shockley, Ann Allen (1989). Afro-American Women Writers 1746-1933: An Anthology and Critical Guide. New Haven, Connecticut: Meridian Books. .

External links
 PBS: Africans in America: Lucy Terry
 Entry at AA Registry
 Encyclopædia Britannica entry for Lucy Terry

African-American poets
African-American women writers
African-American history of Massachusetts
1730 births
1821 deaths
American women poets
18th-century American poets
19th-century American poets
Writers from Massachusetts
18th-century American slaves
People from Deerfield, Massachusetts
People of colonial Massachusetts
19th-century American women writers
18th-century American women writers
18th-century African-American women
19th-century African-American women